WinRed is an American Republican Party (GOP) fundraising platform endorsed by the Republican National Committee. It was launched to compete with the Democratic Party's success in online grassroots fundraising with their platform ActBlue.

Product details
WinRed is a for-profit fundraising platform built for the GOP. GOP leadership began discussing the possibility of building a competitor to ActBlue within days of the 2018 midterm results. WinRed was called Patriot Pass in its initial announcements, with an expected release date of February 2019. The name was changed following Robert Kraft's complaints that the name resembled that of his football team, the New England Patriots.

The GOP, the Trump re-election campaign, and other state-wide and local-level races across the United States used the platform as of late 2019, with nearly 800 campaigns using the platform by May 2020. WinRed discloses donor information to the Federal Election Commission.

WinRed merged Revv, a GOP payment processing firm founded in December 2014 by Gerrit Lansing, and DataTrust, the party's voter data repository. The platform allows one-click donations.

In 2019, the RNC and the Trump administration applied heavy pressure to incentivize all Republican campaigns to use the platform. In April 2020, the platform expanded from its previous representation of only federal-level candidates and opened support to state- and local-level races.

Revenue
WinRed took in $30 million in its first three months after launch, $100 million in its first six, and $130 million in the first quarter of 2020. (In comparison, ActBlue brought in $141 million in April 2020 alone, compared to close to $60 million for WinRed.) Donald Trump was the largest beneficiary, with six senators raising at least $1 million each. Lansing, as well as various Republican operatives, attributed some of this success to the impeachment effort at the time. In the day after Trump's first impeachment was announced, the Trump campaign and the RNC received over $5 million. Lansing reported that Trump had received 52% of overall donations as of May 2020.

Competitors
As part of party negotiations to launch WinRed, the platform Victory Pass was expected to close. The nonpartisan platform Anedot was not involved in discussions among party leadership.

The Trump administration sent a cease and desist letter to WinRed's rival Anedot. The Republican State Leadership Committee, which is in charge of the .gop TLD, revoked the domain registration of the "Give.GOP" website, which re-branded and re-launched in July 2019 as "Right.us". The national Republican party has said it will limit national party committee investments and data to federal candidates and state parties who use WinRed.

Criticism 
Following the aggressive push for Republican campaigns to use WinRed, many party officials, fundraisers, and campaign operatives criticized the effort on several grounds. Some critiqued the requirement that campaigns use WinRed, arguing that the effort pushed aside older services preferred by campaigns like Anedot or Give.GOP. Others expressed concern about profits, noting that it was unclear who stood to gain from use of the service and comparing the higher fees of WinRed to those of competitors.

In the weeks following launch, state officials and campaign operatives pushed back against the Republican Party's consolidation behind WinRed, arguing that the party's acceptance of a monopoly over fundraising violated free-market principles. In addition, they expressed concern that the platform might constitute a money and data grab.

Following the 2020 campaign, several Trump donors said they were unknowingly billed for recurring contributions to his campaign, with some having as much as several thousand dollars deducted without their knowledge. Some experts attributed this, at least in part, to how WinRed's platform was set up. They utilized prefilled checkboxes that donors needed to manually uncheck to prevent repeat donations. In addition, unlike ActBlue, WinRed keeps a cut of refunded contributions. After the release of that reporting, the National Republican Congressional Committee continued to use the same tactic in their fundraising on WinRed.

In 2022, a judge gave permission for an investigation by several state attorneys general into WinRed's fundraising practices to continue.

References

Republican Party (United States) organizations
Political software
2019 establishments in Virginia
Organizations based in Arlington County, Virginia
Political organizations established in 2019